The Tāneatua Branch is a  long branch railway line in the Bay of Plenty, New Zealand, running from Hawkens Junction, west of Edgecumbe, to Tāneatua.

History
From 2 September 1928 to 1978 the line was part of the East Coast Main Trunk (ECMT) line from Hamilton. The original intention was for the ECMT to connect to Gisborne via Paeroa, Tauranga, Opotiki and through the Waioeka Gorge, connecting with the Moutohora Branch to Gisborne; creating a link from the isolated Gisborne section line to Auckland via the Bay of Plenty.

With the opening of the Kaimai tunnel in 1978, the terminus of the East Coast Main Trunk line was changed to Kawerau and the section of line between Hawkens Junction and Tāneatua became the Tāneatua Branch line.

This line across the Rangitaiki Plains follows an inland or southerly route to avoid areas which were swampy at the time of construction, therefore bypassing Whakatāne, the largest town in the area. The intention was for the line to be extended from Tāneatua to Opotiki, then onwards east to connect with the isolated Gisborne Section line from Gisborne.

Some construction work was carried out beyond Tāneatua towards Opotiki in 1928, and an opening ceremony was held for the new line (the ECMT) in Tauranga on 28 March 1928. Work was stopped in July 1928 when the Government of the day transferred the construction workers to the Rotorua-Taupo line which it had just approved the construction of. As late as 1939 £45,000 was provided for extension from Taneatua to Opotiki.

Various routes were investigated and surveyed to link the difficult section between Tāneatua and Moutohora, but all were found to be difficult and expensive. Following the Great Depression, the Second World War and the greater availability of road vehicles in the period after the war, the proposal was dropped and Tāneatua remained the eastern terminus of the railway line in the Bay of Plenty. Gisborne was subsequently linked to the south with Wellington by way of Napier and Palmerston North with the Palmerston North – Gisborne Line in 1942. The isolated Gisborne Section line became the Moutohora Branch line, which closed in 1959.

A passenger service was provided on the line with the Taneatua Express from Auckland between 1928 and 1959. In 1959 railcars replaced this service, but they only operated between Auckland and Te Puke, due to negligible passenger traffic between Te Puke and Tāneatua.

The Whakatane Board Mills Line, a private line, was built and operated by the Whakatane Board Mills from Awakeri to their mill in 1939 to serve their large operation. This line was privately operated by the mill until 1999 when the then national rail operator Tranz Rail took over the operation of the line. Tranz Rail discontinued operating the line in 2001. The line was closed in 2003, together with the mothballing of the entire Tāneatua Branch line.

In 2015 a rail cart operation, Awakeri Rail Adventures, was established on the section of the line from Awakeri eastward to Rewatu Road. Some of the track further east was removed in 2017.

References

Citations

Bibliography

 
 
 Hermann, Bruce J; North Island Branch Lines pp 39,40 (2007, New Zealand Railway & Locomotive Society, Wellington) 
 
 

Railway lines in New Zealand
Rail transport in the Bay of Plenty Region
Railway lines opened in 1928
3 ft 6 in gauge railways in New Zealand
Railway lines closed in 2003
Whakatane District
Closed railway lines in New Zealand